Arnljot Høyland (19 February 1924 – 21 December 2002) was a Norwegian mathematical statistician. He was born in Bærum. He studied at the University of Oslo and later at the University of California, Berkeley in the USA. While a student he worked for the intelligence department at the Norwegian High Command, a military officer with the rank of Major. He lectured at the University of Oslo from 1959 to 1965, and then at the Norwegian Institute of Technology, eventually as a Professor of mathematical statistics. He published the textbooks Sannsynlighetsregning og statistisk metodelære (two volumes) in 1972 and 1973.

In 1944 Høyland composed the melody for Alf Prøysen's song "Julekveldsvise".

He was decorated Knight, First Class of the Order of St. Olav in 1995.

References

1924 births
2002 deaths
People from Bærum
Norwegian mathematicians
Norwegian military personnel
University of Oslo alumni
University of California, Berkeley alumni
Academic staff of the University of Oslo
Academic staff of the Norwegian Institute of Technology
Norwegian textbook writers
Norwegian expatriates in the United States